Carron Crag is a small fell in Grizedale Forest in the English Lake District with a height of . Adjacent to the trig point is a large panopticon sculpture, one of over 70 in the forest. It is the second highest point in Grizedale Forest after Top o'Selside.

It is the subject of a chapter of Wainwright's book The Outlying Fells of Lakeland.  Wainwright describes a circular walk from Grizedale.

Letterbox
Near the trig point is one of a series of hidden letterboxes placed in various locations throughout the Lake District.   
From the trig point go 70 paces 335° to a large standing stone type boulder; the box is 5 paces away under a rock in a small cave behind stones.

References

Fells of the Lake District